Grande Fratello 7 was the seventh season of the Italian version of the reality show franchise Big Brother. The show was produced by Endemol and it was aired from 18 January 2007 to 19 April 2007.

The winner Milo Coretti won a €500,000 cash prize.

Contestants

Nominations table

TV Ratings

References

2007 Italian television seasons
07